Neil Kopp (born 1979) is an American film, commercial and music video producer best known for his work on the films Old Joy (2006) and Paranoid Park (2007).

Life and career
Born and raised in Portland, Oregon, Kopp attended the Vancouver Film School in British Columbia, Canada where he majored in Film Production. He spent his next five years after graduating in Texas and Oregon working as a production manager for commercial and music video production companies including Dallas' Big Fish Films and Portland's Food Chain Films. While with Food Chain, and with director and fellow Vancouver Film School alumnus Dennis Fitzgerald, he produced a number of music videos for Portland-based artists such as The Shins, The Dandy Warhols and The Decemberists.

Kopp's feature film debut was Kelly Reichardt's Old Joy, a 2006 film about two reunited friends based in Mount Hood in Southeast Portland, where he grew up. After reading the film's script, he came aboard the project due to his familiarity with the story's locations, describing Mount Hood and the Bagby Hot Springs area as his "stomping grounds". He was predominantly active in the pre-production of the film, acting as a location scout and location manager, using the back roads and camping grounds he was familiar with from his childhood and young adulthood. As the only producer aboard during filming, Kelly Reichardt has said about Kopp, "He would become the [assistant director]. He was our grip, he learned how to do the car rigging, and he found the stand-ins and the locations. I could not have made this film without [him]." He and the other principal Old Joy crew members were nominated for the Independent Spirit John Cassavetes Award.

Kopp later produced Gus Van Sant's 2007 film Paranoid Park, which, combined with his work on Old Joy, earned him an Independent Spirit Producers Award as well as a nomination for Paranoid Park as Best Film. He also produced Kelly Reichardt's 2008 film Wendy and Lucy, also known under the working titles of Wendy and Train Choir.; and Reichardt's 2010 film Meek's Cutoff.

References

External links

1979 births
Living people
Businesspeople from Portland, Oregon
Film producers from Oregon